Nauticus is a maritime-themed science center and museum located on the downtown waterfront in Norfolk, Virginia, also known as the National Maritime Center.

History 
Nauticus was incorporated under the National Maritime Center Authority in February 1988. The following month, Rear Admiral Jackson Knowles Parker, retired commander of Norfolk Naval Base, became the founding executive director.

Construction began at the former site of Norfolk's Banana Pier on the downtown Norfolk waterfront in February 1992, and Nauticus opened to the public in June 1994. Other visitor attractions close by include the Virginia Zoo, Norfolk Scope, and Harbor Park, home to the Norfolk Tides.

Campus

Half Moone Cruise and Celebration Center
The City of Norfolk opened the Half Moone Cruise and Celebration Center—located at Nauticus on April 7, 2007.

The , passenger-friendly facility features views of the Elizabeth River; an enclosed, elevated passenger gangway; a retractable bridge leading into a 16-slip marina; a terrazzo floor tile in the entrance; a separate lounge and check-in area for cruise line VIP passengers; a security-focused Customs and Border Protection area and an embarkation station. Its first passenger ship, RCI's Empress of the Seas, arrived on April 28, 2007.

Among the areas available for special event rental are the Bermuda Room, which displays artifacts and objects that tell the historic connections between Virginia and Bermuda; the Half Moone Vista, which includes some facts about the original fort; and the Lido and Promenade Decks, which address functions of those traditional decks on board cruise ships.

The name—Half Moone—is taken from the name of the fort that was built on the same site in 1673 in the form of a "half moone." The fort was built to protect Norfolk's burgeoning maritime industry.

USS Wisconsin 

One of the largest battleships ever built arrived at Nauticus on the downtown Norfolk waterfront on December 7, 2000. That date was significant because it marked the 57th anniversary of USS Wisconsins launching in 1943 – two years to the day after the attack on Pearl Harbor.

USS Wisconsin opened for main deck tours on April 16, 2001. That date marked the 57th anniversary of the ship's commissioning in 1944.

Wisconsin, one of four s constructed by the United States Navy, was built from 1941 to 1943 at the Philadelphia Navy Yard and commissioned in 1944.  She played a major role in World War II, earning five battle stars for service against Japanese forces.  She served during the Korean War, and led the Navy’s surface attack on Iraq during the Persian Gulf War in 1991, firing not only her first but also the campaign's first Tomahawk missile. The ship was decommissioned at Philadelphia and retired to the Naval Inactive Reserve Fleet in Portsmouth, Virginia, in October 1996.

On April 16, 2010, exactly 66 years from the day she was commissioned at Philadelphia Naval Shipyard, the United States Navy ceremoniously transferred ownership of the vessel to the city of Norfolk, Virginia. Vice Admiral David Architzel joined Mayor Paul Fraim, other city and military leaders, and former crew members on deck to conduct the ceremony. Vice Admiral Architzel presented the long glass to Norfolk Mayor Paul Fraim signifying that the Mayor now has the watch.

By the end of November 2009, more than 2,495,296 visitors have walked the teak decks of Wisconsin. These visitors have come from all fifty U.S. states and from many other nations to experience the battleship.

Sail Nauticus 

Sail Nauticus is a 501(c)3 nonprofit organization created by the Nauticus Foundation in 2013. Sail Nauticus is a community sailing center, with both adult and youth programs. Its cornerstone program is the Sail Nauticus Academy, an after-school program in partnership with Norfolk Public Schools that teaches middle school students sailing and maritime sciences from a STEM perspective.

Exhibits 
The museum features hands-on exhibits, interactive theaters, aquaria, digital high-definition films and an extensive variety of educational programs. Nauticus has a high-definition large screen theater and shows several nautically-related films on a rotating basis.

The second floor of Nauticus houses the Hampton Roads Naval Museum and the entrance to the battleship Wisconsin. On the third floor of Nauticus, guests can view a variety of science and maritime exhibits, including: aquaria, a horseshoe crab touch tank, shark lab, Science On a Sphere, NOAA exhibits, interactive theaters, and a weather station.  The shark lab of Nauticus is home to three  sharks of two different species. There is one male epaulette shark, two male whitespotted bamboo sharks. In the Fall of 2016, there was also a male brownbanded bamboo shark, but it was relocated to a closed tank near the entrance due to aggressiveness.

See also 
Downtown Norfolk, Virginia

References

External links

Nauticus website
Battleship Wisconsin at Nauticus
Cruise Norfolk website
Half Moone Cruise and Celebration Center website

1994 establishments in Virginia
Buildings and structures in Norfolk, Virginia
Maritime museums in Virginia
Museums established in 1994
Museums in Norfolk, Virginia
Naval museums in the United States
Science museums in Virginia
Downtown Norfolk, Virginia